Steven Agnew (born 12 October 1979) is a Northern Irish politician who served as the leader of the Green Party in Northern Ireland between 2011 and 2018, and was a Member of the Legislative Assembly (MLA) for North Down from 2011 to 2019.

Early life
Agnew was born in Dundonald and studied at Brooklands Primary School, Grosvenor Grammar School and Queen's University Belfast. Sammy Wilson and Michelle McIlveen were teachers at his school. He grew up around a "very negative political landscape", where politics was "about being anti-Catholic, anti the Pope and anti-Sinn Féin."

Political career
Agnew joined the Green Party in 2003 during its campaign against the invasion of Iraq. During a protest march from Queen's to the US Consulate, he met John Barry, who convinced him that "the Green Party had a practical agenda of what needed to be changed". He came to believe "environmental justice is interlinked" with social justice.

At the 2007 Northern Ireland Assembly election, he stood in Belfast East, where he took 2.2% of the vote and was not elected. Brian Wilson was successful for the party at the election, and Agnew became his full-time research officer.  He was the party's candidate for the 2009 European Parliament  election in the Northern Ireland constituency, where he increased the party's share to 3.3%, although he still came bottom of the poll.  At the 2010 United Kingdom general election, he stood in North Down, taking 3.1% of the votes cast. He increased this to 5.4% in 2015 and 6.5% in 2017.

In January 2011, Agnew was elected as the first leader of the Green Party, beating Cadogan Enright in a postal ballot. He successfully contested the North Down seat in the 2011 Northern Ireland Assembly election.

Agnew announced he would step down as the Green Party NI leader from Autumn 2018, citing family reasons. He resigned as an MLA in September 2019 to become head of the Northern Ireland Renewables Industry Group representing the renewable electricity industry in Northern Ireland.

References

External links
Steven Agnew - Northern Ireland Assembly website
Steven Agnew - The Green Party in Northern Ireland website
Steven Agnew - The Green Party in Ireland website (Archive link - 2008)

1979 births
Green Party in Northern Ireland MLAs
Leaders of political parties in Northern Ireland
Living people
Northern Ireland MLAs 2011–2016
People from Dundonald, County Down
Northern Ireland MLAs 2016–2017
Northern Ireland MLAs 2017–2022